Albert Heine (16 November 1867, in Braunschweig – 13 April 1949, in Westerland) was a German-Jewish stage and film actor. He also directed two silent films. He was the director of the Burgtheater in Vienna between 1918 and 1921.

Selected filmography
 Don Juan (1922)
 The Curse (1924)
 Boarding House Groonen (1925)
 The Arsonists of Europe (1926)
 The Monte Cristo of Prague (1929)
 Play Around a Man (1929)
 Daughter of the Regiment (1933)

Bibliography
 Jung, Uli & Schatzberg, Walter. Beyond Caligari: The Films of Robert Wiene. Berghahn Books, 1999.

References

External links

1867 births
1949 deaths
Jewish German male actors
German male film actors
German male stage actors
German male silent film actors
Film directors from Lower Saxony
Actors from Braunschweig
People from the Duchy of Brunswick
20th-century German male actors